Rhodium(IV) oxide (or rhodium dioxide) is the chemical compound with the formula RhO2.

Chemical properties
RhO2 is highly insoluble even in hot aqua regia.

Structure
RhO2 has the tetragonal rutile structure.

Physical properties
RhO2 has metallic resistivity with values <10−4 Ohm·cm. It transforms in air to Rh2O3 at 850 °C and then to metal and oxygen at 1050 °C.

See also
 Rhodium

References

Transition metal oxides
Rhodium compounds